Amalie Baisch (née Marggraff; October 8, 1859, in Munich – after 1904) was a German writer, best known for her Victorian era guide books on young women's etiquette. She wrote under the pseudonym Ernesta.

Life 
Amalie Baisch was born in Munich on October 8, 1859. Her father was Rudolf Marggraff, a professor of Art History and Fine Art at the Academy of Fine Arts, Munich. Her mother was called Elisabeth Marggraff. Amalie Basch attended the Max-Josef-Stift and subsequently took a job as a teacher in Paris. She was a guest in the Parisian salons and travelled extensively. She documented her experiences in a series of literary sketches.

In 1885, Baisch married the author Otto Baisch (1840-1892). Otto had known Rudolf Marggraff since the 1870s. Before his death, Marggraff had been working on a biography of Johann Christian Reinhart, which Otto completed as published in 1882 under the title Johann Christian Reinhart und seine Kreise.

One year before their marriage, Otto took up the position of  editor-in-chief of the illustrated magazine Über Land und Meer in Stuttgart, and thus the pair relocated there. Amalie found a stimulating cultural atmosphere in Stuttgart. In 1886, Baisch gave birth to a son, Hermann Baisch.

From 1886 the family lived in a rented flat at 123 Neckarstraße, in the building of the Deutsche Verlags-Anstalt, the publishers of Über Land und Meer. After the death of Otto Baisch in 1892, Amalie and her son moved to 31 Kernerstraße for a year, before moving back to Munich, were they lived in 14 Barerstraße. Amalie Baisch later remarried to a Major Florian Gassner.

Work 
Amalie Baisch's books had a target audience of young women and were predominantly advice books. Below is a selection of her works:

 Aus der Töchterschule ins Leben. Ein allseitiger Berater für Deutschlands Jungfrauen, 1889
 Die kleiner Feuerwehr, 1892
 Der Mutter Tagebuch. Aufzeichnungen über die ersten Lebensjahre ihres Kindes, 1893
 Das junge Mädchen auf eigenen Füßen. Ein Führer durch das weibliche Berufsleben, 1902
 Hilde Stirner. Eine Jungmädchenerzählung, 1909

References 

1859 births
1904 deaths
German writers
German women writers
19th-century pseudonymous writers
Pseudonymous women writers